Muhammad Nurridzuan bin Abu Hassan Saari is a Malaysian professional footballer who plays as an attacking midfielder for Malaysia Super League club Selangor. He is known for his free-kick ability.

Club career
Nurridzuan began his career at Perak President Cup team setup in 2010. In the following year, he has been promoted into Perak first team and made 15 appearances during his season debut.

In 2012, Nurridzuan was not listed in the Perak's first team and only played for Perak President Cup team. As captain of the youth team, he led the team to the 2012 President Cup championship, scoring 7 goals in the competition including the winning goal in the final against Betaria FC. As a result, Nurridzuan once again were drafted into the first team for the rest of the season.

In 2012, Perak President Cup team played in the 2012 Sukma Games football tournament in Pahang, where Nurridzuan and the team achieved silver medal when they were defeated 3–0 in the final by Sabah after extra time.

In November 2012, Nurridzuan was offered to join Harimau Muda A team, the Malaysian national under-21 team at the time playing in S.League, along with his Perak teammate D. Kenny Pallraj starting 2013 season and the Perak Football Association agreed to release both players to Harimau Muda A. After spent 2 years playing for Harimau Muda side, Nurridzuan returned to Perak for the 2015 season.

In December 2016, Nurridzuan left Perak and signed a contract with Pahang. It was announced by Sports representative agency MVP Sports Agency on their social media. He spent only a season with Pahang, before joining PKNS FC on December 2017, for the 2018 season.

Nurridzuan left PKNS after his contract expired in November 2018. In December, he signed a deal with Selangor, which had the option of being extended depending on his performance for the club.

International career
Due to his good performances in the President Cup team, Nurridzuan, along with his Perak teammate D. Kenny Pallraj was called by Harimau Muda A head coach Ong Kim Swee to join the Harimau Muda A squad for the 2012 VFF Cup friendly tournament. He made his debut for the national under-21 squad in the tournament and was instrumental in helping the team win the tournament, supplying the assist for the winning goal by Hazwan Bakri in the final in a 1–0 win over Vietnam U-21.

Career statistics

Club

1 Includes AFC Cup and AFC Champions League.

Honours

Club
Pahang
 Malaysia FA Cup: Runner-up 2017

Individual
PFAM Player of the Month: June 2015

References

External links

1992 births
People from Perak
Malaysian footballers
Perak F.C. players
Sri Pahang FC players
Association football midfielders
Living people
Malaysian people of Malay descent